Liberty Union may refer to:

 Liberty Union High School, high school in Ohio
 Liberty Union High School District, school district in California
 Liberty Union Party, political party active in Vermont
 Lithuanian Liberty Union, defunct political party in Lithuania